U-32 may refer to one of the following German submarines:

 , was a Type U 31 submarine launched in 1914 and that served in the First World War until sunk on 8 May 1918
 During the First World War, Germany also had these submarines with similar names:
 , a Type UB II submarine launched in 1915 and sunk on 22 September 1917
 , a Type UC II submarine launched in 1916 and sunk on 23 February 1917
 , a Type VIIA submarine that served in the Second World War until sunk on 30 October 1940
 , a Type 212 submarine of the Bundesmarine that was launched in 2003 and in service

U-32 or U-XXXII may also refer to:
 , a  submarine of the Austro-Hungarian Navy

Submarines of Germany